Nicolò Miglani was a Venetian diplomat and colonial official in the 1260s and 1270s.

In 1268–69 he was castellan of Coron in the Morea, together with Nicolò Navigajoso, who was likely the senior of the two. He went on to serve as Bailo of Negroponte in 1271–72, and then was sent as Venetian envoy to Serbia (Rascia) in 1275 along with Navigajoso, after the Serbian king Stefan Uroš I had attacked Ragusa.

References

Sources 
 
 
 

13th-century births
13th-century Venetian people
Ambassadors of the Republic of Venice
Baili of Negroponte
Venetian governors
Ambassadors to Serbia